This is a list of seasons played by AFC Bournemouth in English football, as of 1919 to the most recent completed season. The club was originally known as Boscombe F.C.. The exact date of the club's foundation is not known, but there is proof that it was formed in the autumn of 1899 out of the remains of the older Boscombe St. John's Lads’ Institute F.C.. In their first season 1899–1900 Boscombe F.C. competed in the Bournemouth and District Junior League, part of the Hampshire Football League.

In the season of 1905–06 Boscombe F.C. graduated to senior amateur football. For the first time during the season of 1913–14 the club competed in the F.A. Cup. The club's progress was halted in 1914 with the outbreak of the war and Boscombe F.C. returned to the Hampshire Football League. In 1920 the Third Division was formed and Boscombe were promoted to the Southern Football League. Three years later the club was promoted to the Football League Third Division South at which time they renamed themselves to Bournemouth and Boscombe Athletic Football Club. The club remain on the records as the longest continuous members of the Third Division.

However this period ended in 1970 with relegation, but the club were promoted again the following year. In 1972 the club adopted the more streamlined AFC Bournemouth name. For the first time in 1987 they won promotion to the Football League Second Division. But they only managed to remain there for just three seasons being relegated in 1990. In 2008 Bournemouth had 10 points deducted for entering administration and were relegated. In the 2008–09 Football League Two season they started with a 17-point deduction, but after narrowly avoiding relegation from the Football League that season, they were promoted to League One at the end of the following season. The climb continued. After making the League One play-off semi-finals in 2010–11, and achieving a mid-table finish in 2011–12, Bournemouth won promotion to the Championship at the end of the 2012–13 season, putting them in the second tier of the league for only the second time in their history. In the 2014–15 season, they won the Championship title, and earned promotion to the Premier League for the first time in their history.

Seasons

Key

Pld – Matches played
W – Matches won
D – Matches drawn
L – Matches lost
GF – Goals for
GA – Goals against
Pts – Points
Pos – Final position

Prem – Premier League
Champ – Football League Championship
Lge 1 – Football League One
Lge 2 – Football League Two
Div 1 – Football League First Division
Div 2 – Football League Second Division
Div 3 – Football League Third Division
Div 3S – Football League Third Division South
Div 4 – Football League Fourth Division
SL – Southern League
HL – Hampshire League
HLW – Hampshire League West
n/a – Not applicable

6Q – Sixth qualifying round
PR – Preliminary round
R1 – First round
R2 – Second round
R3 – Third round
R4 – Fourth round
R5 – Fifth round
QF – Quarter-finals
SF – Semi-finals
RU – Runners-up
W – Winners
(S) – Southern section of regionalised stage

Notes

References

Further reading 

seasons
 
Bournemouth